Bank of Colorado Arena at Butler-Hancock Athletic Center is a 2,992-seat multi-purpose arena in Greeley, Colorado, United States. It was built in 1974 and is home to the University of Northern Colorado Bears men's and women's basketball teams, as well as the Bears volleyball, wrestling and indoor track and field programs.

Located on Northern Colorado's west campus, the Bank of Colorado Arena serves as "The Home of the Bears."  Originally named for longtime UNC coaches Pete Butler and John W. Hancock, Butler-Hancock Hall opened its doors February 4, 1975. The venue was renamed the Butler–Hancock Sports Pavilion during the 2004–05 season. It hosted the finals of the 2011 Big Sky Conference men's basketball tournament.

The venue is undergoing renovations including a new seating structure involving chairback, permanent seating along the sides of the court as well as added seating behind each basket. There will be permanent chairback seating behind the east end basket and portable bleacher seating behind the west end goal.

On November 14, 2014, Northern Colorado announced a 15-year naming rights agreement with the Bank of Colorado to rename the arena the Bank of Colorado Arena.

Top 10 Butler-Hancock crowds
 4,674 vs. Wisconsin-Milwaukee (3/18/89)
 4,429 vs. Augustana (2/23/89)
 4,013 vs. Alaska-Fairbanks (3/17/89)
 3,875 vs. South Dakota State (2/25/89)
 3,586 vs. Air Force (2/4/75)
 3,311 vs. Denver (2/7/05)
 3,198 vs. University of Illinois Chicago (3/30/18)
 3,192 vs. Colorado State (12/1/09)
 3,104 vs. South Dakota (1/19/89)
 3,013 vs. Denver (12/28/09)
 2,932 vs. Metro State (12/5/86)

UNC men's basketball year-by-year at Butler-Hancock
Year	  Record  Pct.
1974-75  4-1     .800
1975-76  8-3     .727
1976-77  6-3     .667
1977-78  9-5     .643
1978-79  5-6     .455
1979-80  6-5     .545
1980-81  4-7     .364
1981-82  9-2     .818
1982-83  7-5     .583
1983-84  3-8     .273
1984-85  13-1    .929
1985-86  9-5     .643
1986-87  10-2    .833
1987-88  10-3    .769
1988-89  15-2 #  .882
1989-90  7-6     .538
1990-91  2-10    .167
1991-92  12-4    .750
1992-93  8-5     .615
1993-94  6-7     .462
1994-95  7-6     .538
1995-96  5-7     .417
1996-97  5-8     .385
1997-98  10-3    .769
1998-99  6-6     .500
1999-00  5-7     .417
2000-01  7-5     .583
2001-02  9-3     .750
2002-03  5-6     .455
2003-04  4-5     .444
2004-05  7-4     .636
2005-06  5-9     .357
2006-07  3-9     .250
2007-08  9-4     .692
2008-09  9-4     .692
2009-10  13-2    .867
2010-11  14-0    1.000

Total	 276-172  .616

See also
 List of NCAA Division I basketball arenas

References

External links
 Butler-Hancock Sports Pavilion official site

College basketball venues in the United States
College volleyball venues in the United States
Basketball venues in Colorado
Northern Colorado Bears basketball
Sports venues completed in 1975
1975 establishments in Colorado